Scottie Plays the Duke is the third album by organist Shirley Scott released with the Prestige label.

Reception
The Allmusic review stated "This is a collection of Duke Ellington tunes".

Track listing 
All compositions by Duke Ellington except as indicated
 "Caravan" (Duke Ellington, Juan Tizol) 
 "Just Squeeze Me" 
 "C Jam Blues" 
 "Prelude to a Kiss"   
 "In a Sentimental Mood"  
 "In a Mellow Tone" 
 "I've Got It Bad"
 "Just A-Sittin' and A-Rockin'" (Ellington, Billy Strayhorn)

Personnel 
 Shirley Scott - organ, piano
 George Duvivier - bass
 Arthur Edgehill - drums

References 

1959 albums
Albums produced by Esmond Edwards
Albums recorded at Van Gelder Studio
Prestige Records albums
Shirley Scott albums
Duke Ellington tribute albums